KOZY is an oldies radio station broadcasting on 1320 AM in Grand Rapids, Minnesota. It is owned by Rapids Radio along with its sister stations, KMFY and KBAJ.

The Super Cruiser
The Super Cruiser is KOZY's promotional vehicle used in parades and on location reporting. Originally a 1971 Chevy Ambulance, It was retired and sold to KNNS-FM (Now KOZY's sister station, KMFY). The Super Cruiser has had many color schemes over the years including Yellow, 2 tone blue, and the current black.

Programming

KOZY AM 1320 is a live, local, locally produced radio station.

KOZY is the Grand Rapids area affiliate for the ABC Information Network, with hourly news updates from ABC, and ABC Sports reports.  KOZY is also an affiliate of the Minnesota News Network with hourly newscasts of statewide news, generally at the bottom of each hour.  MNN also provides several Minnesota sports programs throughout the day.  KOZY also airs local area-based news hourly from 6am to 5pm.

KOZY broadcasts games for the Minnesota Twins, Minnesota Timberwolves, Minnesota Golden Gophers (college), Minnesota Wild. The Minnesota Vikings NFL Football Games air on sister station, KMFY.

KOZY is also the longtime flagship station of Grand Rapids High School sports. They also feature "Thunderhawk Talk", a program of news from Grand Rapids High School. Grand Rapids High School hockey will be heard on KOZY's sister station, KBAJ  in 2018.

KOZY airs syndicated programming including "Little Known Facts" with Chaz Allan, "American Hit List" with M.G. Kelly, as well as the "Twilight Zone".

KOZY's music programming features the hit songs of the mid-1950s through the mid-1970s. A music library of literally thousands of musical selections provides a very wide music base generally exceeding that of typical "oldies" radio stations.

DJs
Morning: Tim Edwards & Sheldon Willis "The Morning Mess"
Mid-Day: Sheldon Willis
Evening: Joe Gigliotti
 Hourly local news with News Director Kathy Lynn

External links
KOZY Website

KOZY
Oldies radio stations in the United States
Grand Rapids, Minnesota